Split Island may refer to:

 Split Island (Nunavut), an island in Canada
 Split Island (Saskatchewan), an island in Canada
 Split Island, Falkland Islands
 Hạfliua also known as Split Island, Fiji

See also 

 List of divided islands